Nesah may refer to:
 Nesah Kuh (disambiguation)
 Nesah Kuh Ali Chin
 Nesah Kuh Veysi Chin
 Nesah-ye Allahdad
 Nesah-ye Mazkur va Nasrollah
 Nesah-ye Mohammad Taher
 Nesah-ye Olya
 Nesah-ye Sofla